Engen station is a railway station in the municipality of Engen, located in the Konstanz district in Baden-Württemberg, Germany.

References

Railway stations in Baden-Württemberg
Buildings and structures in Konstanz (district)